Carassioides phongnhaensis is a species of ray-finned fish in the genus Carassioides. It is found in Vietnam.

References

Carassioides
Cyprinid fish of Asia
Fish of Vietnam
Fish described in 2003